Willard Bailey (born June 3, 1939) is a former American football coach and college athletics administrator. He served as head football coach at Virginia Union University from 1971 to 1983 and again from 1995 to 2003, Norfolk State University from 1984 to 1992, Saint Paul's College in Lawrenceville, Virginia from 2005 to 2010, and Virginia University of Lynchburg from 2011 to 2013, compiling a career college football record of 238–169–7. As a coach in the Central Intercollegiate Athletic Association (CIAA), Bailey won seven conference championships, six with Virginia Union and one with Norfolk State. His Virginia Union Panther football teams made five straight appearances in the NCAA Division II football playoffs, from 1979 to 1983, while his Norfolk State Spartan football team made one appearance in the NCAA Division II football playoffs, in 1984.

These are players from Bailey's Virginia Union Panther, Norfolk State Spartan, and Saint Paul's Tiger teams who went on to the National Football League/Canadian League/Arena League:

 Virginia Union:Herbert Scott, Malcolm Barnwell, Carl Bland, Pete Hunter, James Atkins.
 Norfolk State: Willie Gillus, A. J. Jimerson
 Saint Paul's: Greg Toler (the first player from the school to be drafted by the National Football League)

Bailey graduated from Norfolk State in 1962.

Head coaching record

See also
 List of college football coaches with 200 wins

References

1939 births
Living people
Norfolk State Spartans athletic directors
Norfolk State Spartans football coaches
Saint Paul's Tigers football coaches
Virginia–Lynchburg Dragons football coaches
Virginia Union Panthers athletic directors
Virginia Union Panthers football coaches
Norfolk State University alumni
Sportspeople from Suffolk, Virginia
African-American coaches of American football
African-American college athletic directors in the United States
20th-century African-American sportspeople
21st-century African-American sportspeople